The Washington Huskies women's basketball team represents the University of Washington in NCAA Division I college basketball competing in the Pac-12 Conference. Their home games are played at Alaska Airlines Arena at Hec Edmundson Pavilion, located in Seattle.

Alaska Airlines Arena at Hec Edmundson Pavilion

Alaska Airlines Arena at Hec Edmundson Pavilion is the home for the Husky men's and women's basketball teams, volleyball team and gymnastics squad. Originally completed in 1927, Hec Edmundson Pavilion underwent a $40 million, 19-month renovation between March 1999 and November 2000 to reconfigure its interior. The pavilion's name was also changed; originally slated to be "Seafirst Arena at Hec Edmundson Pavilion" when the deal was finalized in 1998, it became "Bank of America Arena at Hec Edmundson Pavilion" at the reopening, as B of A had eliminated the Seafirst brand in 2000. The ten-year sponsorship with the bank expired after the 2009–10 season and was not renewed; during the first half of the 2010–11 basketball season the venue was sponsorless and once again known simply as "Hec Edmundson Pavilion." On January 20, 2011, the university approved Seattle-based Alaska Airlines as the new sponsor of Hec Ed.

History
The women's basketball program began in 1974, with Christine Burkhart serving as coach. She led the Huskies to a .500 record in her only year as head coach. Kathie Neir was the coach for the next four years, with an overall record of 82–31, and a first place finish in the NWBL Coast Division. She was replaced by Pat Dobratz, who served for one year as an interim coach, with a 14–14 record. The Huskies would go on to have winning or .500 records every year from the inception of the program until the year 2000.

Sue Kruszewski took over the coaching reins in 1980, and after leading the team to a 19–12 record, she was nominated for coach of the year honors. While she did not win the top position, she was one of 20 contenders for the honor. After her departure, Joyce Sake took over as head coach. In her second year, the team achieved a record of 26–2, winning the Norpac conference regular season with a perfect 11–0 record, as well as the conference tournament. The team was invited to their first ever appearance in the NCAA Tournament. The team earned their first AP ranking, finishing the 185 season ranked 11th.

In 1985, Chris Gobrecht took over as head coach, and would remain in that position for 11 years. The Huskies exceeded 20 victories in eight of the 11 years. The team won the NorPac regular season outright in 1986, and finished first or tied for first in the 1988 and 1990 seasons. The team earned bids to the NCAA Tournament in nine of the 11 seasons, reaching the Sweet Sixteen in 1988 and the quarterfinals in 1990. The team earned top 25 rankings in the Coaches and AP polls in six of the 11 years, reaching a final season ranking of third place in 1990.

June Daugherty followed Gobrecht, also serving as head coach for 11 years. The Huskies had only one losing seasons in the 11-year period, exceeding 20 wins twice, once in 2001 when the team reached the NCAA quarterfinals. Tia Jackson replaced Daugherty, and remained for four years. Kevin McGuff was hired in 2011 and led the team to consecutive 20-win seasons, and two post-season WNIT bids. After McGuff was hired by Ohio State, assistant coach Mike Neighbors was named head coach for the 2013–14 season. While McGuff was head coach, he persuaded Adia Barnes, with college experience at Arizona and professional experience with the Houston Comets, Seattle Storm, Minnesota Lynx, and Sacramento Monarchs to become an assistant coach. She remained in that position under Neighbors until leaving for her alma mater—Arizona—in 2016. Neighbors left after the 2016-17 season to return to Arkansas, his alma mater.

Jody Wynn was named head coach on April 14, 2017 after serving as the head coach at Long Beach State for the previous eight seasons.

Year by year results
Source

|-style="background: #ffffdd;"
| colspan="8" align="center" | Pacific-10 conference

Postseason results

NCAA Division I

AIAW Division I
The Huskies made one appearance in the AIAW National Division I basketball tournament, with a combined record of 0–1.

School records
Source

Active players in italics.

Career leaders

Single-season leaders

Single-game leaders

References

External links